Balclutha Aerodrome  is a small airport 0.5 Nautical Miles (1 km) southeast of Balclutha township on the east coast of the South Island, New Zealand.

The aerodrome is operated by and is home to the South Otago Aero Club.  The aerodrome is popular with model aircraft enthusiasts and glider pilots.

Operational information:
Airfield elevation is 22 ft AMSL 
Runway 07/25, 666 x 91 meters grass 
No Runway lighting available 
Surface strength ESWL 820
Circuit: RWY 07 - right hand; RWY 25 - left hand 
Circuit Height: 1000 ft AMSL

Sources 
NZAIP Volume 4 AD
AIP New Zealand (PDF)

External links 
South Otago Aero Club

Airports in New Zealand
Balclutha, New Zealand
Transport in Otago
Transport buildings and structures in Otago